The Martini Cup was a golf tournament on the Swedish Golf Tour from 1984 to 1987. It was played in Rya and Torekov, Sweden.

Winners

References

Swedish Golf Tour events
Golf tournaments in Sweden
Recurring sporting events established in 1984
Recurring sporting events disestablished in 1987
1984 establishments in Sweden
1987 disestablishments in Sweden